The fourth season of Caribbean's Next Top Model, a Caribbean reality television show, premiered on 14 February 2018. It features a number of aspiring models from the entire Caribbean region, who compete for a chance to begin their career in the modelling industry. The fourth season of the show has 16 contestants and was taped in Jamaica. The winner was Le Shae Riley from Trinidad & Tobago.

Cast

Contestants
(''Ages stated are at start of contest'

Episodes

Results

 The contestant was eliminated from the competition
 The contestant won the competition

Photo shoots
Episode 1 photo shoot: Raw beauty in comp cards (casting) 
Episode 2 photo shoot: Extreme posing while showcasing makeovers & promotional shots
Episode 3 photo shoot: Modeling with headpieces on garden fields
Episode 4 photo shoot: Gold bikini on a beach
Episode 5 photo shoot: Close-up natural beauty shots
Episode 6 photo shoot: Sexy styling editorial in a dancehall
Episode 7 photo shoot: Flying with a fabric in mid-air
Episode 8 photo shoot: Marriage couture by the seashore
Episode 9 photo shoot: Posing on a window hole with metallic body paint
Episode 11 photo shoot: Posing in gowns at the Devon House

References

Television in the Caribbean
2018 television seasons
4